The 2011 Yale Bulldogs football team represented Yale University in the 2011 NCAA Division I FCS football season. The Bulldogs were led by third-year head coach Tom Williams and played their home games at the Yale Bowl. They are a member of the Ivy League. They finished the season 5–5, 4–3 in Ivy League play to finish in a tie for second place. Yale averaged 23,729 fans per game.

Schedule

References

Yale
Yale Bulldogs football seasons
Yale Bulldogs football